Juan Victorino González Enríquez (born 24 June 1964) is a Spanish judoka. He competed in the men's half-middleweight event at the 1988 Summer Olympics.

References

External links
 

1964 births
Living people
Spanish male judoka
Olympic judoka of Spain
Judoka at the 1988 Summer Olympics
Place of birth missing (living people)